WLZL (107.9 FM, "El Zol 107.9 FM") is a commercial FM radio station licensed to serve College Park, Maryland. The station is owned by Audacy, Inc. through licensee Audacy License, LLC and broadcasts a Spanish tropical format.

WLZL broadcasts using HD Radio.

History

The station signed on for the first time in 1960 with the WFSI call sign. WFSI was owned by Family Radio and aired a Christian radio format.

On November 16, 2011, CBS Radio announced plans to acquire WFSI from Family Radio, with the intention of moving WLZL's Spanish Tropical format and El Zol branding from 99.1 to 107.9, with a new all-news format to be launched on 99.1. The format change occurred on December 1, when both stations began simulcasting El Zol programming. WFSI also swapped call signs with WBGR, a Family Radio-owned AM station in Baltimore, the same day. The 99.1/107.9 simulcast ended on December 12, 2011, with the WLZL call sign moving from 99.1 to 107.9 and the new WNEW-FM call sign debuting on 99.1.

These changes brought WLZL into compliance with current FCC rules regarding maximum ERP and HAAT for a Class B station. WLZL had been operating using facilities that exceeded these parameters as a "grandfathered" facility. On May 7, 2014, the FCC granted a request by CBS Radio to change the community of license for the station from Annapolis, Maryland to College Park, Maryland, as a modification of the construction permit. The reason given was to provide College Park with its first local transmission service.

On February 2, 2017, CBS Radio announced it would merge with Entercom. The merger was approved on November 9, 2017, and was consummated on the 17th.

References

External links

LZL
LZL
Tropical music radio stations
Radio stations established in 1960
1960 establishments in Maryland
Audacy, Inc. radio stations